MK-1TS Micron () is a small Ukrainian microsatellite manufactured by Yuzhmash. MK-1TS was launched on December 24, 2004, at 13:20 from the Plesetsk cosmodrome (Russia) using a Cyclone-3 launch vehicle together with Sich-1M satellite. Both satellites were placed into incorrect orbits due to premature third stage cutoff.

The satellite was active until September 30, 2005.

Purpose 
MK-1TS had a small on-board camera (MBTC-VD), to provide digital optical-electronic images in the panchromatic range. One of its tasks was to work out a new system of orientation on the base of a magnetometer and electromagnets without using auxiliary devices.

See also 

 Space program of Ukraine
 2004 in spaceflight
 Sich-1
 Sich-2

References 

Spacecraft launched in 2004
2004 in Ukraine
Satellite meteorology
Satellites of Ukraine
Yuzhmash satellites and probes